Mohini is a 2018 Indian Tamil-language supernatural horror film written and directed by Ramana Madhesh, starring Trisha and Jackky Bhagnani in the lead roles. The film, which was predominantly shot across London, began production in June 2016. 

The film was released on 27 July 2018. Upon release, the film received negative reviews and was declared a flop.

Plot
Vaishnavi is a popular YouTube chef living in Chennai, Tamil Nadu, India. Her friend Ambuja's fiancé Cotton is stuck in a situation that demands him to go to London to work as a chef, but he is unqualified and steals Vaishnavi's recipe to get a job. He asks Vaishnavi to accompany him to pose as an assistant and help him secure the job so that he can be financially stable. After Ambuja and Cotton's wedding, Vaishnavi agrees and travels to London with Cotton and a relative Balki. They stay with their friends Ganesh (Ganeshkar) and his wife Madhu and work as chefs at a restaurant in the Park Grand Hotel in Hounslow. Vaishnavi meets Sandeep there, and they fall in love.

Vaishnavi accidentally injures herself and washes off her blood in the water. This drop of blood triggers the vengeful spirit of a dead woman at the bottom of the river. She possesses Vaishnavi, who goes on a killing spree. Her friends experience numerous paranormal occurrences soon after and consult with a priest to find that Vaishnavi is possessed. The spirit turns out to be Mohini, a doppelganger of Vaishnavi. Meanwhile, Sandeep proposes to Vaishnavi, and they get engaged in the presence of his family. They meet Sandeep's mother Menaka and his estranged father Vicky/KVR. Mohini is enraged upon seeing him, and this reminds her of why she was killed. When Vicky/KVR announced Sandeep as heir to his Property, Mohini decides to kill Vicky/KVR and his goons who had killed her.

Mohini was an architect working for a construction company owned by KVR in London. She finds out about the child sacrifice rituals (Narabali) that KVR believes in and goes on to rescue children from a child trafficking gang owned by KVR. KVR and the gang are arrested, but they get released because of KVR's political influence. KVR and his men then capture Mohini, kill her, and throw her body into the Thames River. Now that she has found a doppelgänger in Vaishnavi, Mohini returns for revenge. She goes after Vicky/KVR and kills him, but not before telling that all of his generation will be killed by her, and that includes Sandeep. Menaka, KVR's wife, learns of this and tries to protect Sandeep from Mohini with the help of a Buddhist monk. She also contacts Mohini's mother, who agrees to help with the rituals that they are performing. The monk tells that in addition to the rituals, either Vaishnavi's body must be destroyed or a human sacrifice has to be done to appease Mohini. Meanwhile, when Sandeep and Vaishnavi move into their new home, Vaishnavi sees a picture of Vicky/KVR whom Mohini had killed. This triggers Mohini's anger and tries to kill Sandeep and chases him into a church. Mohini taunts Sandeep that she will kill Vaishnavi. The monk calls Sandeep and tells him that there is a waterfall behind the church which makes the water holy. Sandeep tries to swim through the river to reach the monastery, where his mother, the priest, Cotton, Madhu, Ganesh and Balki are waiting, but Mohini cannot follow him through the river and can only run on dry land. When the two reach, They all prevent Mohini from attacking Sandeep and try to save Vaishnavi from dying in the process. Mohini's mother finds that because of her daughter's vengeance, two innocent lives will be lost. She realizes that Mohini's spirit needs just one human life in order to be satisfied, so she kills herself and offers as a sacrifice to Mohini in front of the Goddess. Mohini's spirit is finally at peace and leaves Vaishnavi and Sandeep alone.

Later on, it is shown that Mohini's spirit still lives on and hunts down anyone who tries to cause harm to children, She possesses Neha, a child who was groped by the school bus driver.

Cast

Production

Development
Trisha signed on to play the titular role in the film during early May 2016 and announced that she would collaborate with director Ramana Madhesh for the first time. Titled Mohini, the film was announced as a production venture for Prince Pictures, with Vivek-Mervin as music composers and Dinesh Ponraj as the editor.

Filming
The film began production in London during June 2016 with scenes shot in areas including Leicester Square, Piccadilly Circus and Tower Bridge. They held a month long schedule, with Hindi actor Jackky Bhagnani joining Trisha and a team of comedians for the schedule.

Music

The soundtrack was released on 12 January 2018 through Think Music India.

Release
Tamil Nadu theatrical rights of the film were valued at 6 crore. The satellite rights of the film were sold to Zee Tamil.

Reception
The moral of the film's story was questioned, since according to the plot human sacrifice was necessary, which took place during the final scenes. Other controversies include some negative portrayals of London, England, and the mentioning about the British rule of India and the plunder of India by the British East India Company. Some critics claimed that India should refrain from discussing about its colonial past and never criticise Britain. They also denied the importance of freedom struggle and revolutionaries.

References

External links
 

2018 films
Indian supernatural horror films
Indian comedy horror films
Films shot in London
2010s Tamil-language films
Films set in London
2010s supernatural horror films
2018 comedy horror films